Results and statistics from Maria Sharapova's 2008 tennis season.

Yearly summary

Australian Open series 
Sharapova began her season at the Australian Open, as the 5th seed. She won the tournament without dropping a set (or playing a tie-break set), as she gained redemption following the previous year's heavy defeat in the final to Serena Williams. En route, she defeated Lindsay Davenport in the second round, served three bagels (one each to Elena Vesnina, Elena Dementieva and World No. 1 Justine Henin, whom she defeated very impressively in the quarter-finals) and defeated Jelena Janković (who had defeated the defending champion Williams in the quarter-finals) in the semi-finals, before facing Serbian Ana Ivanovic in the final. In a match dubbed as the "Glam Slam final", Sharapova upset the highly fancied Serb in straight sets to claim her first Australian Open title, and third Major title.

Middle East series 
After playing two Fed Cup rubbers for Russia to kick off February, Sharapova then competed at the Qatar Ladies Open. She defeated Galina Voskoboeva, Tamarine Tanasugarn, Caroline Wozniacki and Agnieszka Radwańska (who had benefited from the withdrawal of top seed Ana Ivanovic in the third round) before facing (and defeating in three sets) Vera Zvonareva in the final.

Sharapova then withdrew from Dubai due to a viral infection.

Indian Wells & Miami 
Sharapova reached the semi-finals at Indian Wells for the third time in four years, but was defeated there by compatriot and eventual runner-up Svetlana Kuznetsova, bringing an end to her 18-match winning streak to start the season. Following Indian Wells, Sharapova withdrew from Miami, citing a recurring shoulder injury.

Clay court season

American clay court season 
After withdrawing from Miami, Sharapova won her first career clay court title in Amelia Island, defeating Dominika Cibulková in the final. At Charleston, she lost to eventual champion Serena Williams in the quarter-finals.

European clay court season 
After deciding to skip the 2008 Qatar Telecom German Open, Sharapova next played at the Internazionali BNL d'Italia, reaching the semi-finals before being forced to withdraw from her match against eventual champion Jelena Janković due to a calf injury.

Following Justine Henin's surprise retirement during the same week as the Rome event, Sharapova was elevated to World No. 1 in the rankings. Subsequently, she was named as the top seed at the French Open, which she needed to win to complete a Career Grand Slam (and thus protect her top ranking). After surviving a close final set against compatriot Evgeniya Rodina in the first round, and another three-setter against Bethanie Mattek in the second, Sharapova fell in the fourth round in three sets to eventual finalist Dinara Safina, having held several match points in the second set. As a result, she lost her World No. 1 ranking, after just three weeks, to Ana Ivanovic, who went on to win the tournament.

Wimbledon 
Sharapova's 2008 Wimbledon campaign turned out to be short-lived, as she was defeated in the second round by Alla Kudryavtseva, in the process suffering her earliest ever defeat at Wimbledon, and her earliest defeat at a Major tournament since the 2003 US Open.

US Open series and shoulder injury 
Sharapova next played at the 2008 Rogers Cup, however she had to withdraw following her second round win against Marta Domachowska due to a recurring shoulder injury, which ended up being serious enough to necessitate surgery. As a result, Sharapova was forced to withdraw from her remaining tournaments for the year, including the Olympic tennis tournament in Beijing, the US Open (thus missing her first Major tournament since her debut in 2003) and the year-end championships. Her withdrawals from those events eventually led to her finishing the year ranked World No. 9, her lowest year-end singles ranking since 2003.

All matches 
This table chronicles all the matches of Sharapova in 2008, including walkovers (W/O) which the WTA does not count as wins. They are marked ND for non-decision or no decision.

Singles matches

Tournament schedule

Singles Schedule

Yearly Records

Head-to-head matchups 
Ordered by percentage, number of victories to number of losses, then in alphabetical order

  Alona Bondarenko 2–0
  Dominika Cibulková 2–0
  Bethanie Mattek 2–0
  Caroline Wozniacki 2–0
  Stéphanie Cohen-Aloro 1–0
  Eleni Daniilidou 1–0
  Lindsay Davenport 1–0
  Elena Dementieva 1–0
  Marta Domachowska 1–0
  Stéphanie Foretz 1–0
  Daniela Hantuchová 1–0
  Justine Henin 1–0
  Ana Ivanovic 1–0
  Jelena Janković 1–0
  Karin Knapp 1–0
  Anabel Medina Garrigues 1–0
  Tzipora Obziler 1–0
  Shahar Pe'er 1–0
  Agnieszka Radwańska 1–0
  Evgeniya Rodina 1–0
  Tamarine Tanasugarn 1–0
  Jelena Kostanić Tošić 1–0
  Tatiana Perebiynis 1–0
  Patty Schnyder 1–0
  Elena Vesnina 1–0
  Galina Voskoboeva 1–0
  Barbora Záhlavová-Strýcová 1–0
  Vera Zvonareva 1–0
  Alla Kudryavtseva 0–1
  Svetlana Kuznetsova 0–1
  Dinara Safina 0–1
  Serena Williams 0–1

Finals

Singles: 3 (3–0)

See also 
 2008 Serena Williams tennis season
 2008 WTA Tour

References

External links 

Maria Sharapova tennis seasons
Sharapova, Maria
2008 in Russian tennis